During the 2002–03 Spanish football season, RCD Mallorca competed in the La Liga.

Season summary
Mallorca finished the season in 9th position in the La Liga table. In other competitions, Mallorca winner of the Copa del Rey.

Samuel Eto'o and Walter Pandiani was the top scorer for Mallorca with 14 goals in all competitions.

Squad

Goalkeepers
  Alberto Cifuentes Martínez
  Leo Franco
  Miki Garro

Defenders
  Ángel Pérez
  David Cortés
  Federico Lussenhoff
  Miguel Ángel Nadal
  Fernando Niño
  Xabier Olaizola
  Poli
  Miquel Soler
  Vicente

Midfielders 
  Alejandro Campano
  Ariel Ibagaza
  John Harold Lozano
  Marcos
  Paco Soler
  Raúl Martin
  Albert Riera
  Julián Robles

Attackers 
  Leonardo Biagini
  Carlitos
  Samuel Eto'o
  Alvaro Novo
  Walter Pandiani
  Tuni
  José Oscar Flores

Competitions

La Liga

League table

References 

RCD Mallorca seasons
Mallorca